The Ministry of Justice, Immigration and Labor of the Marshall Islands is a ministry of the government of the Marshall Islands. The role of the ministry is to promote the safety of its citizens, oversee the administration of the Attorney General, prosecute criminal cases, defend the federal government from any civil suits and oversee, incorporate and charter approved corporations.

In 2017, the ministry's name was changed from the Ministry of Justice to its current name.

List of ministers (Post-1986 upon achieving independence) 

 Kunio Lemari (1987-1988)
 Christopher Loeak (1988-1992)
 Kunar Lucknar Abner (1993-1997)
Lomes McKay (1998)
Hemos Jack (1999)
Witten Philippo (2000-2004)
Donald Capelle (2004-2006)
Witten Philippo (2006-2008)
David Kramer (2008-2010)
Brenson Wase (2010-2011)
Thomas Heine (2012-2015)
Rien Morris (2015-2016)
Atbi Riklon (2016)
Thomas Heine (2016-2017)
Mike Halferty (2017-2018)
Jack Ading (2018–2020?)
Kessai Note (2020-2022)
Jack Ading (2022-present)

See also 
 Justice ministry
 Politics of the Marshall Islands

References 

Justice ministries
Government of the Marshall Islands